A heavy liquid is a solution or liquid chemical substance with a high density and a relatively low viscosity. Heavy liquids are often used for determination of density in mineralogy, for density gradient centrifugation and for separating mixtures.

Uses 

Common applications of heavy liquids include:
 Density gradient centrifugation
 Separating mixtures and sink/swim analysis
 Flotation process
 Determination of density

Toxicity 

The classical heavy liquids like 1,1,2,2-tetrabromoethane (Muthmanns solution), potassium tetraiodomercurate(II) (Thoulets solution), bromoform or diiodomethane which are used in mineralogy are very toxic. These toxic chemicals are avoided today in consideration of the fact that there are alternative water based, non-toxic heavy liquids like sodium polytungstate solutions. With this relatively new heavy liquid densities up to 3.1 g·cm−3 can be adjusted . Adding parts of pulverulent Tungsten carbide increases the density to 4.6 g·cm−3.

List of common heavy liquids with density > 2.0 g·cm−3

References

Literature 
Schnitzer W, Zur Problematik der Schwermineralanalyse am Beispiel triassischer Sedimentgesteine, in International Journal of Earth Sciences, 72/1983, S.67–75, ISSN 1437-3254 (Print) 1437-3262 (Online)
 Boenigk, Schwermineralanalyse, S.6–15, Stuttgart: Enke, 1983.
 Ney, Gesteinsaufbereitung im Labor, S.92–113, Stuttgart: Enke, 1986.

External links 
General information about non-toxic heavy liquids

Density
Liquids